This article lists the Ministers of Education of Catalonia.

List

References

External links
 

 
Education